Cyperus nduru is a species of sedge that is found across tropical Africa, including; Central African Republic, Angola, Republic of Congo, Democratic Republic of Congo, Cameroon, Malawi, Mozambique, Ghana, Nigeria, Guinea, Tanzania, Zimbabwe and Sierra Leone.

The species was first formally described by the botanist Henri Chermezon in 1931.

See also
 List of Cyperus species

References

nduru
Taxa named by Henri Chermezon
Plants described in 1931
Flora of Angola
Flora of Cameroon
Flora of Malawi
Flora of Mozambique
Flora of Ghana
Flora of Nigeria
Flora of Guinea
Flora of Tanzania